John Palmer House may refer to:

John Palmer House (Lisbon, Connecticut)
John Denham Palmer House, Fernandia Beach, Florida
John Palmer House (Portland, Oregon)

See also
Palmer House (disambiguation)